Mark Blitz (born March 15, 1946) is an American political philosopher and Fletcher Jones Professor of Political Philosophy at Claremont McKenna College.

Books
Plato's political philosophy, Baltimore : Johns Hopkins University Press, . 2010
Conserving liberty, Stanford, Calif. : Hoover Institution Press, Stanford University, 2011
Duty bound : responsibility and American public life, Lanham (Md.) : Rowman and Littlefield publ. , . 2005
Heidegger's Being and time and the possibility of political philosophy, Ithaca : Cornell university press, . 1981
Duty bound, Lanham (Md.) Rowman and Littlefield publ. . 2005
Reason and Politics: The Nature of Political Phenomena, 2021

References

21st-century American philosophers
Philosophy academics
Living people
1946 births
Political philosophers
Claremont McKenna College faculty